Victor White may refer to:
 Victor White (aviator) (1895–1967), British World War I flying ace
 Victor White (priest) (1902–1960), Dominican priest